Jaru (also Romanized as Jārū; also known as Jārn) is a village in Howmeh Rural District, in the Central District of Haftgel County, Khuzestan Province, Iran. At the 2006 census, its population was 83, in 21 families.

References 

Populated places in Haftkel County